In Gaudiya Vaishnavism, a bhajan kutir is a residence or meditation hut used by ascetics. They are usually a small, basic residence located in Vrindavan.

See also
Gaudiya Vaishnavism
Vrindavana
Radha ramana
Radha Krishna
Svayam Bhagavan

Hindu architecture
Hindu holy cities
Vaishnavism
Sacred groves